Move Somethin' may refer to:
Move Somethin', a 1988 album by 2 Live Crew 
"Move Somethin'", a song by Reflection Eternal (Talib Kweli & DJ Hi-Tek) from their 2000 album Train of Thought
"Move Somethin'", a song by LL Cool J from his 2004 album The DEFinition